Dunnington Halt railway station served the village of Dunnington, North Yorkshire, England from 1913 to 1926 on the Derwent Valley Light Railway.

History 
The station opened 21 July 1913 by the North Eastern Railway. It closed to both passengers and goods traffic on 1 September 1926.

References

External links 

Disused railway stations in North Yorkshire
Railway stations in Great Britain opened in 1913
Railway stations in Great Britain closed in 1926
1913 establishments in England
1926 disestablishments in England